The Kennedy-Wade Mill, or Wade's Mill, is a grist mill and national historic district located in Raphine, Virginia and listed on the National Register of Historic Places. It was originally built c. 1750 by Captain Joseph Kennedy. In 1846 the mill was sold by the Kennedy family to Henry B. Jones, who expanded and improved the mill. After passing to other owners in 1867, the mill was damaged by fire in 1873.  It was rebuilt and leased to (and later bought by) James F. Wade, and put back into use in November 1882.  The Wade family continued to operate it for four generations. It was bought in 1991 by Jim Young, and is still functioning today. The mill grinds flour using millstones and a 21-foot overshot water wheel. The flour is shipped to restaurants and livestock farmers.

Nearby and also part of the Kennedy-Wade's Mill Historic District are the miller's house and other houses and outbuildings structures forming the small mill community.

References

External links
Wade's Mill

Grinding mills on the National Register of Historic Places in Virginia
Historic districts on the National Register of Historic Places in Virginia
National Register of Historic Places in Rockbridge County, Virginia
Buildings and structures in Rockbridge County, Virginia
Watermills in the United States
Flour mills in the United States
Tourist attractions in Rockbridge County, Virginia
Grinding mills in Virginia
1793 establishments in Virginia
Industrial buildings completed in 1793